This single contains the opening and ending themes for the Baldr Force EXE Resolution OVA. Face of Fact (Resolution Ver.) is the opening theme performed by Kotoko while Undelete is the ending theme which was performed by Mami Kawada.

Track listing 
Face of Fact (Resolution Ver.) (Kotoko) -- 5:01
Lyrics: Kotoko
Composition/Arrangement: C.G mix
Undelete (Mami Kawada) -- 5:19
Lyrics: Mami Kawada
Composition: Tomoyuki Nakazawa
Arrangement: Tomoyuki Nakazawa, Maiko Iuchi
Face of Fact (Resolution Ver.) (instrumental) -- 5:01
Undelete (instrumental) -- 5:17

Charts and sales

2006 singles
Anime soundtracks
2006 songs